The 1985 United States House of Representatives special election in Texas's 1st congressional district was held on June 29, 1985 to select the successor to Sam B. Hall (D) who was appointed as a U.S. District Judge by President Ronald Reagan. Since no candidate received an outright majority during the first round, a special runoff was held on August 3, 1985. Republicans saw this special election as a prime opportunity to demonstrate the political realignment of East Texas, as the district had supported Republicans Ronald Reagan and Phil Gramm in 1984. Gramm had arranged Hall's appointment to the judiciary in an attempt to see a Republican elected from the area.

Runoff 
During the runoff campaign, Assistant U.S. Attorney General William Bradford Reynolds sued the state of Texas, saying the election had to be approved by the U.S. Department of Justice under preclearance established by Section 5 of the Voting Rights Act of 1965. Governor Mark White complied with a judicial ruling and submitted the request, and the runoff was not postponed. Reynolds denied having any political motivations in his actions.

Despite the district's shift towards the Republicans, Democrat Jim Chapman narrowly won the runoff, keeping the seat in Democratic hands.

References 

Texas 1985 01
Texas 1985 01
1985 01
Texas 01
United States House of Representatives 01
United States House of Representatives 1985 01